Ross Island is an island of the Andaman Islands.  It belongs to the North and Middle Andaman administrative district, part of the Indian union territory of Andaman and Nicobar Islands.

Geography
The island is located in Aerial Bay, near Diglipur, and is part of Aerial Bay Islands.

Administration
Ross Island, along neighbouring Aerial Bay Islands, is part of Diglipur Taluk.

Tourism

References 

Islands of North and Middle Andaman district
Lighthouses in India